The term Dutch Crossing may refer to:
 Yankee Dutch Crossing, which is an American modification of an English country dance named Dutch Crossing
 Dutch Crossing, which is an academic journal about Dutch culture and language